Saint Bernard's Seminary is a historic former Catholic seminary complex located at Rochester in Monroe County, New York. The educational institution formerly inhabiting the complex changed its name to St. Bernard's Institute and moved to the campus of Colgate Rochester Divinity School in 1981 and was renamed again to St. Bernard's School of Theology and Ministry when it moved to a new campus on French Road in 2003. The original property was owned by Kodak between 1982 and 1992.  It was eventually sold to a private developer and is now a senior citizen residential complex.

Description
The campus of Saint Bernard's is a group of four interconnected buildings designed by noted Rochester architects Warner & Brockett and built between 1891 and 1908. The four buildings are the Center or Main Building (1891–1893), the Chapel (1891–1893), the South Building or Philosophy Hall (1900), and the North Building or Theology Hall (1908).  All four buildings use Medina Sandstone in their construction and share a Victorian Gothic style of architecture with stone walls and brick trim.

It was listed on the National Register of Historic Places in 1996.

Gallery

See also
St. Bernard's School of Theology and Ministry

References

External links
St. Bernard’s School of Theology and Ministry Website

Properties of religious function on the National Register of Historic Places in New York (state)
Roman Catholic churches in New York (state)
Gothic Revival architecture in New York (state)
Roman Catholic churches completed in 1893
Roman Catholic churches in Rochester, New York
National Register of Historic Places in Rochester, New York
19th-century Roman Catholic church buildings in the United States